The 1973 World Sambo Championships were held in Tehran, Iran on September 6–11. It was the first World Sambo Championships. The participating teams were from Bulgaria, Mongolia, Iran, Spain, Japan, United States, USSR, Yugoslavia, etc. For the first time World Sambo Championships was part of the FILA World Wrestling Championships (1975 and 1983 editions also included Sambo contest.)

Team ranking

Medal overview

References

World Sambo Championships
International sports competitions hosted by Iran
World Sambo Championships
Sport in Tehran
20th century in Tehran
World Sambo Championships
World Sambo Championships